The 41st Regiment "Cordenons" is a Surveillance and Target Acquisition unit of the Italian Army. Originally a field artillery regiment, the regiment is today a multi-arms unit operationally assigned to the Tactical Intelligence Brigade, which combines elements of the artillery and signal arms. The regiment is based in Sora in Lazio.

History

World War I 
In Ma7 1915 the 41st Field Artillery Regiment with three artillery groups was formed. In World War I the regiment fought on the Italian front. After the war the regiment was disbanded on 17 March 1919.

World War II 

The regiment was reformed on 15 September 1939 as 41st Artillery Regiment "Firenze" and assigned to the 41st Infantry Division "Firenze". In March 1941 the division was sent to Albania for the upcoming Axis-Invasion of Yugoslavia. After the invasion the division remained in Macedonia and Montenegro as occupation force. Following the announcement of the Armistice of Cassibile on 8 September 1943 the Firenze division attempted to retreat from Macedonia to Albania and by there over the Adriatic Sea to Southern Italy. As the division found its route of retreat blocked by German forces the division's commanding officer General Arnaldo Azzi negotiated with the Yugoslav partisans for the division to join the Albanian National Liberation Army. On 28 September 1943 the division was split into four brigade-sized Military Zone Commands, which operated alongside Yugoslav and Albanian partisans in the area from Qafa e Shtamës to Debar. For its service with the Yugoslav Partisans the regiment was awarded a Silver Medal of Military Valour.

Cold War 
On 1 May 1947 the 41st Anti-tank Field Artillery Regiment was formed in Florence and assigned to the Infantry Division "Folgore". In 1951 the regiment was renamed 41st Anti-tank Artillery Regiment and moved to Bassano del Grappa. On 10 April 1952 the regiment was reorganized as 41st Heavy Field Artillery Regiment and assigned to the V Army Corps. The regiment was based in Padua  and consisted of a regimental command, a command and services battery, one howitzer group equipped with M59 155mm towed howitzers and two howitzer groups equipped with M114 155mm towed howitzers.

During the 1975 army reform the army disbanded the regimental level and newly independent battalions were granted for the first time their own flags. On 3 June 1976 the 41st Heavy Field Artillery Regiment was disbanded. On the same day the regiment's flags and traditions were assigned to the V Artillery Specialists Group in Cordenons, which was renamed 41st Artillery Specialists Group "Cordenons". The V Artillery Specialists Group had been formed on 1 June 1956 as artillery target acquisition group for the V Army Corps. In 1977 the Cordenons was transferred to the 3rd Missile Brigade "Aquileia" and moved on n 28 November 1977 to the city of Pordenone. At the time the group consisted of a group command, a command and services battery, a target acquisition battery and a remotely guided aircraft battery.

In 1986 the Cordenons was transferred back to the 5th Army Corps. On 1 December 1991 the group moved to the city of Casarsa della Delizia. On 31 July 1993 the group received the Remotely Guided Aircraft Battery of the 13th Target Acquisition Group "Aquileia". In 1999 the group was reorganized as 41st Surveillance and Target Acquisition Group and equipped with counter-battery radars. On 19 September 2001 the group was elevated to 41st Field Artillery Regiment "Cordenons". On 1 June 2004 the regiment was renamed 41st Regiment "Cordenons" and reorganized as a battlefield surveillance unit with multi-sensor batteries. The same day the regiment was assigned to the RISTA-EW Brigade, which on 5 November 2018 was renamed Tactical Intelligence Brigade.

Current structure 
As of 2022 the 41st Regiment "Cordenons" consists of:

  Regimental Command, in Sora
 Command and Logistic Support Battery
 Multi-Sensor Group
 1st Multi-Sensor Battery
 2nd Multi-Sensor Battery
 3rd Multi-Sensor Battery

The Command and Logistic Support Battery fields the following sections: C3 Section, Transport and Materiel Section, Medical Section, and Commissariat Section. The regiment is equipped with RQ-7 Shadow 200, RQ-11B Raven and Bramor C4EYE unmanned aerial vehicles, IA-3 Colibrì unmanned quadcopters, Thales SQUIRE ground surveillance radars, and ARTHUR counter-battery radars.

External links
Italian Army Website: 41° Reggimento "Cordenons"

References

Artillery Regiments of Italy